The 2010–11 Premier Academy League Under–18 season is the fourteenth edition since the establishment of The Premier Academy League, and the seventh under the current make-up.

All teams played the other teams in their group twice and play 10 inter-group fixtures, producing 28 games a season. Eight of the inter-group games were played against teams in their 'paired group' (i.e. A–B and C–D are the paired groups), whilst the remaining two games comprise one game against a team in each of the two remaining groups. Winners of each group qualify for play-offs.

League tables

Academy Group A 
Updated as of 16 April 2011

Academy Group B

Academy Group C

Academy Group D 

Rules for classification: 1st points; 2nd goal difference; 3rd goals scoredPos = Position; Pld = Matches played; W = Matches won; D = Matches drawn; L = Matches lost; GF = Goals for; GA = Goals against; GD = Goal difference; Pts = PointsQ = Qualified for playoffs; C = Champions

Play-off semi-finals

Play-off Final

See also 

 2010–11 Premier Reserve League
 2010–11 FA Youth Cup
 2010–11 Premier League
 2010–11 in English football

References

External links 
 Fixture and Results on official website

2010-11 Premier Academy League
Acad
Academy